Sin-le-Noble is a commune in the Nord department in northern France.

Population

Notable people 
 Pierre-Jules Boulanger, born in 1885 in Sin-le-Noble: contributed in the manufacturing of the 2CV.
 Simonne Ratel (1900–1948), woman of letters, winner of the 1932 edition of the  Prix Interallié.
 Maurice Allard, bassoonist, born in Sin-le-Noble (1923-2004)

Twinning
 Cecina, Italy
 Święta Katarzyna, Lower Silesian Voivodeship, Poland
 Yéné, Senegal

See also
Communes of the Nord department

References

Sinlenoble
French Flanders